Fast Crew (or fastCREW) were a New Zealand hip hop group consisting of five members – Dane Rumble (aka Kid Deft), Jeremy Kent-Johnston (Jerome Fortune), Diablo Deville (Brad Devcich), Gemma Copas and DJ Alias (Josh Thorne).

Fast Crew have supported international artists such as Missy Elliott, Busta Rhymes, The Black Eyed Peas, D12, Chingy, and DMX, and played at the Big Day Out tours. Their second album is now completed. The band played their last concert and "a mutual decision to split the band was decided" in late 2008.

History of the band
Fast Crew was formed in Auckland, New Zealand in 1999, and after some experimentation, the group began playing live around Auckland. Their first single Mr Radio was released in 2002 and received high radio and television airplay.

In May 2003, Fast Crew released the single "I Got" which spent 23 weeks on the New Zealand Top 40 Singles Chart and achieved gold status. As a result of the success of "I Got", the group began to open for such international acts such as Busta Rhymes and Missy Elliott on their New Zealand tours and were signed as the first act on new independent central Auckland based record label AKrite Records, who entered into a deal with Universal Music to distribute the group's singles and album Set the Record Straight. "I Got" finished the year at No. 17 on the New Zealand Top 40 Chart for 2004.

While "I Got" spent time on the charts, Fast Crew began working on their first album Set the Record Straight and released their second single of the album, "It's the Incredible", in November.

The album Set the Record Straight was released in December 2004 and achieved gold status within a week of its release and a peak position of No. 11. With the release of the album the group toured New Zealand to promote it. The album also reached the top 100 in Australia and continued to rise up the charts with the success of the latest single release in Australia, "Suburbia Streets". The band also performed to rave reviews at music festival 'Big Day Out' Auckland and East Coast cities of Australia.

Fast Crew's third single from Set the Record Straight, called "Suburbia Streets", was released in March 2005 and reached a height of No. 10 in NZ.

With continued success in New Zealand Fast Crew entered Australia with "I Got" reaching No. 22 on the ARIAnet singles chart in May 2005, following the rise and success of fellow New Zealand rapper Scribe. In August the same year, It's the Incredible was also released in Australia, reaching No. 41. "Suburbia Streets" debuted on 20 February 2006 at No. 39 in the Australian charts.

The Fast Crew's efforts in breaking the Australian market were dealt a small blow in late 2005 after it was found that the group had used an unauthorised sample of the Eagles's song "Victim of Love" in their track "It's the Incredible". The album and single were immediately withdrawn in both the New Zealand and Australian markets. The album was re-released into the Australian market with a remix (sample free) version of "It's the Incredible".

Fast Crew received 3 nominations at the 2006 Australasian Urban Music Awards : Nominations for Best Hip Hop Single "I Got", Best Hip Hop Album Set the Record Straight and Best Hip Hop Group.

The group split up after Jeremy, the main producer left the Crew a year before they ended in late 2008.

Truth Lies and Redtape
"What Happened to Yesterday (Full Mix)" is the first single off the album Truth Lies and Redtape which was re-released online (This occurred due to distributing issues of the album to the music stores) on 29 September 2008 and in stores 13 October 2008.
The latest single Fly was released 26 May 2008 but did not make it onto the New Zealand Music charts. Fast Crew also a third single off Truth Lies and Redtape titled Highs and Lows which was released early in 2009.

Discography

Albums

Singles

References

External links
 Fast Crew Official Website

Dane Rumble
New Zealand hip hop groups